PyScripter is a free and open-source Python integrated development environment (IDE) for Windows. It is built with Delphi's Object Pascal and Python.

It originally started as a lightweight IDE designed to serve the purpose of providing a strong scripting solution for Delphi applications. Over time, it evolved into a full-featured stand-alone Python IDE. It is built in Delphi using Python4Delphi (P4D) and is extensible using Python scripts. Being built in a compiled language make it rather lightweight compared to some of the other IDEs. Currently, it is only available for Windows.

Features

Syntax highlighting editor 
 Unicode based
 Full support for encoded Python source files
 Brace highlighting
 Python source code utilities: (un)tabify, (un)comment, (un)indent, etc.
 Code completion and call tips
 Code and debugger hints
 Syntax checking during typing
 Context-sensitive help on Python keywords
 Parameterized code templates
 Accept files dropped from Explorer
 File change notification
 Converting line breaks in Windows, Unix, Macintosh
 Print preview and print syntax highlighted Python code
 Syntax highlighting of HTML, XML and CSS files
 Split-view file editing
 Firefox-like search and replace
 Side-by-side file editing

Integrated Python interpreter 
 Code completion
 Call tips
 Command history
 Execute scripts without first saving

Integrated Python debugger 
 Remote Python debugger
 Call stack
 Variables window
 Watches window
 Conditional breakpoints
 Debugger hints
 Post-mortem analysis
 Can run or debug files without first saving

Editor views 
 Disassembly
 HTML documentation (pydoc)

File explorer 
 Easy configuration and browsing of the Python path
 Integrated version control using Tortoise CVS or Tortoise SVN

Project manager 
 Import extant directories
 Multiple run configurations

Integrated unit testing 
 Automatic test generation
 Unit testing GUI

External tools (external run and capture output) 
 Integration with Python tools such as PyLint, TabNanny, Profile, etc.
 Powerful parameter functionality for customized external tool integration

Other 

 Code explorer
 Access to Python manuals via help menu
 To do list
 Find and replace in files
 Integrated regular expression testing
 Choice of Python version to run via command-line parameters
 Run Python script externally, highly configurable
 Find definition, references
 Find definition by clicking and browsing history
 Modern GUI with docked forms and configurable look and feel (themes)
 Persistent configurable IDE options

External links 
 
 PyScripter on GitHub

Free integrated development environments for Python
Python (programming language) software
Software using the MIT license
Windows integrated development environments
Pascal (programming language) software